The 2001 Intercontinental Cup was an association football match played on 27 November 2001 between Bayern Munich, winners of the 2000–01 UEFA Champions League, and winners of the 2001 Copa Libertadores, Boca Juniors, which was also the defending champions. The match was played at the neutral venue of the National Stadium in Tokyo in front of 51,360 fans. Samuel Kuffour was named as man of the match. This was the last Intercontinental Cup played in Tokyo, since International Stadium Yokohama in Yokohama was used from 2002 edition.

Venue

Match details

See also
2000–01 UEFA Champions League
2001 Copa Libertadores
FC Bayern Munich in international football competitions

References

External links
FIFA Article

 

2001–02 in European football
2001 in South American football
2001 in Japanese football
2001
FC Bayern Munich matches
Boca Juniors matches
2001
2001–02 in German football
Sports competitions in Tokyo
November 2001 sports events in Asia
2001 in Tokyo
2001 in association football